This is a list of Croatian television related events from 1982.

Events

Debuts

Television shows

Ending this year

Births
10 February - Tatjana Jurić, TV & radio host
2 September - Barbara Radulović, TV host
15 December - Mia Kovačić, TV host

Deaths